The Burning Cross is a 1947 American drama film directed by Walter Colmes. It was written by Aubrey Wisberg and released by Screen Guild Productions.

The film depicts Ku Klux Klan activities and was censored in Virginia and Detroit.

Plot
A war veteran joins the Ku Klux Klan and comes to regard it as evil.

Cast
Henry H. Daniels Jr. as Johnny Larrimer
Virginia Patton as Doris Greene
Dick Rich as Lud Harris
Joel Fluellen as Charlie West
John Fostini as Tony Areni
Betty Roadman as Agatha Larimer
Raymond Bond as Chester Larrimer
Matt Willis as Mort Dauson - the Grand Dragon
John Doucette as Toby Mason

Production
The film was made by Somerset Pictures,  established in 1947 by Walter Combes, Solly Levenstein and Jake Milstein. It was their first movie. They signed an agreement with Screen Guild Productions to distribute. The New York Times called Screen Guild "a minor organization which can afford the risk of alienating the Southern market."

Filming started in June 1947. It was shot at a new studio at Cahuenga, where offices for the Metro organisation had been.

Release
The film was banned in Virginia and Detroit.

References

External links

The Burning Cross at BFI

1947 films
American crime drama films
1940s English-language films
1947 crime drama films
Lippert Pictures films
Films directed by Walter Colmes
Films scored by Raoul Kraushaar
American black-and-white films
Films with screenplays by Aubrey Wisberg
Films about the Ku Klux Klan
1940s American films